KFUO (850 kHz) is a non-commercial AM radio station licensed to Clayton, Missouri and serving Greater St. Louis. It has a Christian talk and teaching radio format. Owned and operated by The Lutheran Church–Missouri Synod (LCMS), its radio studios and offices are in the LCMS headquarters in Kirkwood, Missouri.

KFUO is a daytimer station. By day, it is powered at 5,000 watts, using a non-directional antenna. Because KFUO operates on the same frequency as Class A KOA (AM) Denver, KFUO must sign off at sunset. As such, the on-air hours vary depending on time of year. The station's website plays sacred music when the 850 signal is dark. KFUO broadcasts using HD Radio technology. The transmitter is on the grounds of the Concordia Seminary in Clayton.

Programming
KFUO's programming includes Bible studies (e.g., Thy Strong Word), theological and social commentary (e.g., Law and Gospel and Issues, Etc.), and Christian lifestyle shows such as The Coffee Hour and Midday Moments. Several hours a day are devoted to Lutheran sacred music, which is also available on the website when the AM station is off the air during the night.

The station broadcasts a total of four Lutheran church services each weekend. They are heard late Saturday afternoon, two on Sunday morning and one heard late Sunday afternoon.

History

Raising funds
The first step in the creation of KFUO was at a meeting of the Board of Control of Concordia Seminary on February 19, 1923, when the chairman of the board, Richard Kretzschmar, urged that a radio station be built at either the seminary or at Concordia Publishing House. The proposal was then presented to the Board of Directors of the Lutheran Laymen's League, which agreed to support the effort financially, with an initial pledge of $2,285. Students at the seminary raised $1,500 from friends and families, and also allocated $1,000 from the student treasury. The St. Louis Lutheran Publicity Association promised $1,000 for annual maintenance. In total, $7,000 was raised by the end of May 1923.

Since the project was estimated to cost $14,000, the seminary board asked the Walther League (the young adult organization of the LCMS) for assistance. The Walther League agreed to raise the remaining $7,000. A "radio committee" that included John H. C. Fritz (dean of the seminary) and Walter A. Maier (executive secretary of the Walther League) was formed to oversee the project.

Sign on
Construction soon began at the seminary, which at that time was located on South Jefferson Avenue in St. Louis. The control room and studio for the 500-watt transmitter were located in the attic of one of the seminary buildings. The license to broadcast was issued on October 25, 1924, and the next day (October 26) the station went on air for the first time to cover the laying of the cornerstone for the new seminary being constructed in Clayton.

The station was formally dedicated and began regular broadcasting on December 14, 1924.

Early programming
Initially the station broadcast two programs each week and shared the 550 kHz frequency with station KSD (now KTRS), which was owned by the St. Louis Post Dispatch. In 1927, the Federal Radio Commission moved KFUO to a time share with station KFVE (later KWK) at 1280 kHz, but reversed that decision a month later. That same year the station moved to the new campus of Concordia Seminary in Clayton. The $50,000 cost of the new facilities and 1000-watt transmitter was funded by the Lutheran Laymen's League. The League also agreed to provide $20,000 to $25,000 annually for operations. Under the agreement, which had been accepted by the LCMS convention on June 15, 1926, the station was placed under the authority of the seminary's Board of Control. The new facilities were dedicated, and broadcasting begun, on May 29, 1927.

By 1928 the station was broadcasting 21 hours per week. Under the terms of the shared frequency arrangement with KSD, KSD had 80% of the broadcast time while KFUO had 20%. In 1936, KFUO petitioned the Federal Communications Commission (FCC) to allow it to use 50% of the time and increase its transmitter power to 5,000 watts, and in September of that year KSD petitioned the FCC to move KFUO to a different frequency so that KSD would have exclusive rights to the 550 kHz frequency. While the FCC was considering both petitions, Elzey Roberts, the publisher of the St. Louis Star-Times, offered to buy KFUO for $100,000, but the offer was declined. In March 1938, the FCC denied both petitions. KFUO appealed, but the United States Court of Appeals for the District of Columbia affirmed the decision in 1939.

Changing frequencies
In 1940, KFUO petitioned the FCC to move it to the 830 kHz frequency and to increase its transmitter power to 5,000 watts. The FCC approved the move to 830 kHz on July 1, 1940. The request for the 5,000-watt transmitter was approved in November of that year, but the new transmitter did not become operational until September 1941.

Many stations were required to change frequencies in 1941, with the enactment of North American Regional Broadcasting Agreement (NARBA). The FCC reassigned KFUO to 850 kHz, where it has remained. Because it is a daytimer, KFUO operates between 80 1/2 and 102 1/2 hours per week, depending on the times of sunrise and sunset in Denver, Colorado, where KOA, the clear-channel station on the 850 kHz frequency, is located. The increase in power and broadcast hours required the erection of a new tower and antenna system, installation of the new transmitter, and the renovation and enlargement of the studio.

During this time, KFUO also began broadcasting The Lutheran Hour, which is still heard on over 700 stations worldwide.

On November 7, 2022, STLToday.com reported that KFUO has asked the FCC for permission to buy KXFN (1380 AM) for $570,000 from Catholic talk radio network Relevant Radio. This would provide KFUO a night-time AM signal in St. Louis.

FM radio
FM station KFUO-FM, originally at 104.1 MHz, began operation in 1948 as a simulcast of the AM station. It later moved to 99.1 MHz. In 1975, due to Federal Communications Commission (FCC) regulations requiring separate programming on FM stations, KFUO-FM switched to broadcasting classical music. But the expense of running both stations was increasing and the Missouri Synod decided to sell the FM outlet.

In March 2010, the KFUO-FM was sold to Gateway Creative Broadcasting. On July 7 of that year it switched to a Contemporary Christian format, knowns as "Joy 99." It now has the call sign KLJY.

FCC charges
In 1997, KFUO-AM-FM was investigated by the FCC. The agency charged that the LCMS had violated the FCC's Equal Employment Opportunity requirements by not hiring enough minorities and women and by requiring a knowledge of Lutheran doctrine in order to be hired by KFUO and KFUO-FM.

After losing appeals within the FCC, the LCMS appealed to the United States Court of Appeals for the District of Columbia Circuit. That court found, in Lutheran Church–Missouri Synod v. FCC (1998), that the FCC's requirements were unconstitutional.

Studios and streaming
KFUO began streaming its broadcast on the station's web site, kfuo.org, in 1998. Program archives on the site were spotty until the station began formally archiving its programs in 2003. In 2004, KFUO launched its HD radio station, the first in Missouri.

The studios of KFUO were moved to the LCMS International Center, the denomination's headquarters in Kirkwood, Missouri, on June 24, 2013, in order to provide modern facilities and to allow easier access to denomination's leaders and organizations. The transmitter remains at Concordia Seminary. At the time of the move, the old studio at the seminary had been the oldest radio studio in continuous operation in the United States.

The station accepts pledges from businesses, individuals, congregations, and organizations which go directly to the station's owner, the Lutheran Church–Missouri Synod. The Synod subsidizes the station as needed. KFUO derives only limited revenue from sponsorship messages and retains its non-commercial status.

Issues, Etc.
During Holy Week 2008 (March 18) the theological talk show, Issues, Etc., was abruptly discontinued from KFUO's program line-up after 15 years on the air. The show was distributed to Christian radio stations across the U.S. In each city outside the St. Louis area the program was sponsored by local LCMS congregations, not by KFUO or the national LCMS office. The producer and host of Issues, Etc. were fired with no explanation.

Three weeks after the cancellation, KFUO management issued an official announcement citing programmatic and stewardship (business) reasons as the cause for cancellation. Management claimed that the station was running deficits into the hundreds of thousands of dollars every year, that Issues, Etc. (the most expensive program to produce at KFUO-AM) was contributing significantly to those deficits, and that the LCMS no longer had the ability to subsidize or overcome these shortfalls. There was no way to verify management's claims because the station does not have a policy of making its financial information available to the public.

On April 14, 2008, a group of some 50 to 60 people suspecting ulterior motives for the cancellation held a demonstration at the LCMS International Center. An online petition to reinstate the show collected more than 7,000 signatures.

Issues, Etc. resumed operations as an independent listener-supported broadcast on June 30, 2008, on another St. Louis radio station, KSIV, and through on-line internet streaming at issuesetc.org. Radio stations in five other states now carry the program live, and podcast downloads are distributed through the show's website. In February 2009, the LCMS officially gave up its legal claim to the trademark name "Issues, Etc.", which it had allowed to lapse in 1999. The trademark name is now owned by Lutheran Public Radio, the current production company of Issues, Etc.

On March 13, 2012, Issues, Etc. returned to KFUO in a new arrangement whereby Lutheran Public Radio pays the station for broadcast airtime. The program now maintains complete control of its own financial matters and program content as gained following the 2008 split.

Awards
In 2000, KFUO won a "Gold Angel" award at the 23rd annual "International Angel Awards" ceremony held in Hollywood, California. The award is the highest honor bestowed by Excellence in Media, a Hollywood-based organization devoted to promoting morality in film, television, video, radio, and print.

See also
 Louis J. Sieck

References

External links

FCC History Cards for KFUO

FUO
FUO (AM)
Lutheran Church–Missouri Synod